The San Bernard River is a river in Texas.

Course 
It passes through portions of Austin, Brazoria, Colorado, Fort Bend, Matagorda and Wharton counties. It passes alongside the Attwater Prairie Chicken National Wildlife Refuge, which shelters one of the last populations of the critically endangered Attwater's prairie-chicken, a ground-dwelling grouse of the coastal prairie ecosystem.

The San Bernard River is one of a small number of rivers in Texas which empties directly into the Gulf. Its mouth was impeded in 2005 causing it to drain into the Gulf Intracoastal Waterway, but was later corrected.  Shortly after being opened back up, the entrance silted in again, and remains so at this time.

Watershed 
The San Bernard drains approximately 1,850 square miles (4800 km²) of land,  and its basin area is home to approximately 87,000 people according to the 1990 census. The region was once the home of the Karankawa Indians. The river runs near West Columbia, Texas and along one side of Camp Karankawa, a camping facility of the Boy Scouts of America.

See also

List of rivers of Texas
East Bernard, Texas

References

External links
 Official Website of F.O.R. San Bernard
 

Rivers of Texas
Drainage basins of the Gulf of Mexico
Rivers of Brazoria County, Texas